Crypsiphona is a genus of moths in the family Geometridae.

Species
 Crypsiphona amaura Meyrick, 1888
 Crypsiphona melanosema Meyrick, 1888
 Crypsiphona ocultaria (Donovan, 1805)

References
 Crypsiphona at Markku Savela's Lepidoptera and Some Other Life Forms
 Natural History Museum Lepidoptera genus database

Pseudoterpnini
Geometridae genera